Mughan FK was an Azerbaijani football club, based in Salyan. The club reached the Azerbaijan Premier League for the first time in 2008–2009. The club was first promoted after FK Masallı withdrew for the 2008/09 season. On 31 October 2008, FK NBC Salyan changed its name to FK Mughan.

History 
Founded in 2007, FK Mughan played their first season in the First Division, A Grupu, under the name of FK NBC Salyan. Finishing First in this group, they were admitted to the Second stage of the season. The club failed to achieve promotion, finishing third in the group. However, FK Masallı withdrew for the 2008/09 season, so FK Mughan gained a spot in the Azerbaijan Premier League.

In the 2008/09 season, FK NBC Salyan changed their name in FK Mughan on 31 October 2008. Their first match in the Azerbaijan Premier League was against FK Qäbälä. They lost 4–1. Their first victory was in round 3. Against PFC Turan Tovuz they won with 3–1. Finishing the season on the 12th spot, FK Mughan had just enough points to stay clear of relegation.

In 2010–11 season, club finished 8th place but due sponsorship reasons, club is ruled out to participate in the next season and will be replaced by Simurq PFC. In 2012, club's owners announced that club will be dissolved and they will not be participating in Azerbaijan First Division.

Colours and crest 
FK Mughan's traditional kit is a white shirt with orange sides, white shorts with white socks. Their away kit is an orange with white sides.
FK Mughan's current logo contains jumping gazelles, which is the sign of swiftness, speed and agility in Azerbaijani folklore.

League and domestic cup history

Managers 
 Vladislav Kadyrov (2007–2008)
 Nadir Gasymov (2008–2009)
  Kemal Alispahić (2009)
 Almir Hurtić (2009–2010)
 Bahman Hasanov (2010–2011)
 Heydar Aghayev (2011–2012)

References

External links 
 
 FK Mughan at PFL.AZ

 
Football clubs in Azerbaijan
Association football clubs established in 2007
Salyan, Azerbaijan
Salyan District (Azerbaijan)
2007 establishments in Azerbaijan
Defunct football clubs in Azerbaijan
Association football clubs disestablished in 2012